Tomorrow is a 2019 computer animated Bangladeshi short film directed by Mohammad Shihab Uddin which was released in 2019 on Deepto TV. The film is produced by Kazi Zahin Hasan and Kazi Zeeshan Hasan for Kazi Media Limited while Cycore Studios provided the animation and production services for the film. The main purpose of the film is to explain the climate change crisis to children. It won the best animation film award at Cannes world film festival for the month of August, 2021.

Plot
A young boy named Ratul in Bangladesh, is magically shown two very different visions of the future. In the first scenario, Bangladesh has been inundated by rising sea levels, causing great suffering. In the second scenario, fossil fuels have been replaced by renewable energy and Bangladesh is prosperous.

The film explains that burning fossil fuels causes climate change, and that the climate crisis can be solved by taxing fossil fuels so that fossil fuels are replaced with renewable energy and nuclear power.

Voice cast

 Deepak Kumar Goswami as Batasher Buro (Old Wind Man) 
The character was inspired by the ghosts of A Christmas Carol
 Eashan Abdullah as Ratul (younger)
 Mohammad Morshed Siddique as Ratul (adult)
 Raju Ahmed as father of Ratul
 Tom Freeman as foreigner journalist
 Sajib Roy as villager 01  
 Rafiqul Islam as villager 02 
 Shafiqul Islam as villager 03
 Albino George Pike as villager 04
(Voice over: Mohammad Bari)

Release
The short film originally released on Deepto TV, a Bangladeshi satellite television in 29 November 2019. After about one month, it was officially released on YouTube.

Reception
Bill Mckibben, founder of 350.org, tweeted about the film.

References

2019 television films
2019 films
2019 computer-animated films
Bangladeshi animated films
Bengali-language Bangladeshi films
Bangladeshi television films
2010s Bengali-language films